Kurtzina is a genus of small, predatory sea snails, marine gastropod mollusks in the family Mangeliidae.

Species
Species within the genus Kurtzina include:
 Kurtzina beta (Dall, 1919)
 Kurtzina crossata (Dall, 1927)
 Kurtzina cymatias  (H.A. Pilsbry & H.N. Lowe, 1932)
 Kurtzina cyrene (Dall, 1919)

References

  Bartsch, P, Some turrid mollusks of Monterey Bay and vicinity; Proceedings of the Biological Society of Washington, v. 57 p. 57-68

External links
  Bouchet P., Kantor Yu.I., Sysoev A. & Puillandre N. (2011) A new operational classification of the Conoidea. Journal of Molluscan Studies 77: 273-308
 Worldwide Mollusc Species Data Base: Mangeliidae
  Tucker, J.K. 2004 Catalog of recent and fossil turrids (Mollusca: Gastropoda). Zootaxa 682:1-1295.

 
Gastropod genera